Danny Busick (born 1959) is an American politician. He is a member of the Missouri House of Representatives from the 3rd District, serving since 2019. He is a member of the Republican party.

Electoral history

State Representative
 Danny Busick was unopposed in the Republican primary elections in 2018 and 2020.

References

Living people
1950s births
Republican Party members of the Missouri House of Representatives
21st-century American politicians